Patoka may refer to:

in New Zealand
 Patoka, New Zealand, rural community in the Hawke's Bay Region

 in Poland
 Patoka, Lower Silesian Voivodeship (south-west Poland)
 Patoka, Pomeranian Voivodeship (north Poland)

 in the United States
 Patoka, Illinois, a village in Marion County
 Patoka, Indiana, a town Gibson County
 Patoka Lake, a reservoir in Indiana
 Patoka Township, Gibson County, Indiana
 Patoka River, in Indiana
 USS Patoka (AO-9), a US Navy ship
 USCGC Patoka (WLR-75408), a US Coast Guard 75′ Gasconade class river buoy tender (WLR)

See also